The 2001 European Figure Skating Championships was a senior international figure skating competition in the 2000–01 season. Medals were awarded in the disciplines of men's singles, ladies' singles, pair skating, and ice dancing. The event was held at the Ondrej Nepela Ice Rink in Bratislava, Slovakia from January 21 to 28, 2001.

Qualifying
The competition was open to skaters from European ISU member nations who had reached the age of 15 before 1 July 2000. The corresponding competition for non-European skaters was the 2001 Four Continents Championships. National associations selected their entries based on their own criteria. Based on the results of the 2000 European Championships, each country was allowed between one and three entries per discipline.

Medals table

Competition notes
Due to the large number of participants, the men's and ladies' qualifying groups were split into groups A and B.

This was also the 1st European Figure Skating Championships that National Anthem of The Russian Federation was heard.

Results

Men

Ladies

Pairs

Ice dancing

External links
 2001 European Figure Skating Championships

European Figure Skating Championships, 2001
European Figure Skating Championships, 2001
European Figure Skating Championships
Figure skating in Slovakia
International figure skating competitions hosted by Slovakia
Sports competitions in Bratislava
European Figure Skating Championships
2000s in Bratislava